Markson is a surname. It is a surname very popular among Jewish. Notable people with the surname include:

Abram Markson (1888–1938), Russian violinist and conductor
Ben Markson (1892–1971), American screenwriter 
David Markson (1927–2010), American writer
Gerhard Markson, German conductor
Sharri Markson (born 1984), Australian journalist

References

Jewish surnames